Howard railway station is located on the North Coast line in the Fraser Coast Region of Queensland, Australia. It serves the town of Howard.

History
Howard station opened in 1883 to service the nearby colliery. The station has a wooden waiting shelter. Opposite the platform lies a passing loop.

Services
Howard is served by long-distance Traveltrain Tilt Train services to Bundaberg and Rockhamption.

References

External links

Howard station Queensland's Railways on the Internet

Buildings and structures in Maryborough, Queensland
Railway stations in Queensland
Railway stations in Australia opened in 1883
North Coast railway line, Queensland
Howard, Queensland